Aida Emilevna Garifullina (born 30 September 1987) is a Russian lyric soprano of Tatar descent. She was the winner of the 2013 Operalia competition and has featured in a number of productions staged at the Mariinsky Theatre, St. Petersburg and the Vienna State Opera. She has a recording contract with Decca Records.

Biography and musical career

Early career
Aida Garifullina was born in 1987 in a Tatar family in Kazan, the capital of the Republic of Tatarstan. Her father is Emil Damirovich Garifullin, and her mother is Layla Ildarovna Garifullina (a choir conductor), who is currently the Director of the Centre of Contemporary Music, n.a. Sofia Gubaidulina. From her early childhood Garifullina's musical development was influenced by her mother, who was instrumental in the development of her career. At the age of 18, Garifullina moved to Nuremberg, Germany to study music.

In 2007, she joined the Vienna University of Music and Performing Arts under Claudia Visca. Two years later Garifullina made her debut as Despina in the university production of Mozart's Così fan tutte. In 2010, she won the Muslim Magomayev's competition of singers in Moscow.

After graduating in 2011, she performed during the closing ceremony of the XXVI Summer Universiade in Shenzhen, and sang a duet with Alessandro Safina in Kazan.

In 2012, Garifullina sang at the opening of the Russian House at the XXX Summer Olympics in London. In London she became acquainted with Valery Gergiev, the artistic director of the Mariinsky Theatre in St. Petersburg. In January 2013 she made her debut at the Mariinsky Theatre in the role of Susanna in the Opera Buffa of Mozart's The Marriage of Figaro. She later added to her repertoire the roles of Gilda (Rigoletto) and Adina (L'elisir d'amore).

In July, as the Ambassador of the Universiade, she sang at the opening Ceremony of Summer Universiade 2013 in Kazan. She also performed at the closing ceremony of "Cultural Universiade" with the Mariinsky Theatre Orchestra. The performance was conducted by Valery Gergiev.

Operalia 2013 and subsequent career
Garifullina's career received a significant boost when she won first prize in Operalia 2013. At the contest, there were arias of Nanetta (Falstaff), Snow Maiden (The Snow Maiden), Susanna (Le nozze di Figaro), and Giulietta (I Capuleti e i Montecchi). In October she was awarded the title "Honored Artist of the Republic of Tatarstan" and a Commendation Certificate of the President of the Republic of Tatarstan.

During 2013 and 2014 she was featured in a number of prominent performances, alongside the likes of José Carreras, Plácido Domingo and Dmitry Hvorostovsky. In 2014 she performed at the Rosenblatt Recitals held at the Wigmore Hall, London. 2015 saw her sign a recording contract with Decca Records.

Since the beginning of the 2014/2015 season, she is an ensemble member of the Vienna State Opera. She portrayed the French-American soprano star Lily Pons and performed "The Bell Song" from Delibes' opera Lakmé in a downward-transposed key in the 2016 film Florence Foster Jenkins. In February 2017 she released a self-titled album on Decca, which contains 15 arias recorded with the ORF Radio-Symphony Orchestra directed by Cornelius Meister.

On 13 June 2018, Garifullina performed at the 2018 FIFA World Cup opening gala concert held at the Red Square in Moscow. She performed with Anna Netrebko, Juan Diego Florez and Placido Domingo and the Mariinsky Theatre Orchestra conducted by Valery Gergiev. On 14 June, Garifullina performed at the 2018 FIFA World Cup opening ceremony held at the Luzhniki Stadium in Moscow. She performed a duet of "Angels" with English pop singer Robbie Williams.

Personal life 

Garifullina has one sibling, a brother named Rem. Garifullina has a daughter, Olivia, born in 2016. She is known to have dated tennis player Marat Safin for a year or two from 2016 to 2017. Her voice coach for 2 years while studying in Vienna in 2007 was Claudia Visca, an American soprano. Her favorite well-known opera soprano is Anna Moffo.

Repertoire 
 G. Donizetti – Don Pasquale, Norina
 G. Donizetti – L'elisir d'amore, Adina
 P. Eötvös – Tri sestri, Irina
 C. Gounod − Roméo et Juliette, Juliette
 F. Halévy – La Juive, Princess Eudoxie
 W. A. Mozart – Così fan tutte, Despina
 W. A. Mozart – Don Giovanni, Zerlina
 W. A. Mozart – Le nozze di Figaro, Susanna
 W. A. Mozart – Die Zauberflöte, Pamina
 S. S. Prokofiev – War and Peace, Natasha Rostova
 G. Puccini – La bohème, Musetta
 N. A. Rimsky-Korsakov – The Golden Cockerel, Queen of Shemakha
 N. A. Rimsky-Korsakov – The Snow Maiden, The Snow Maiden
 G. Rossini – L'italiana in Algeri, Elvira
 G. Verdi – Un ballo in maschera, Oscar
 G. Verdi – Falstaff, Nannetta
 G. Verdi – Rigoletto, Gilda
 G. Verdi - La Traviata, Violetta

Selected discography 
 Aida Garifullina (2017)

Awards and titles 
 "Best Female Vocalist in Classical Music" at the Russian National Music Awards (2015).

References

External links 

 
 Aida Garifullina biography at Opera Vivrà

1987 births
Living people
Russian sopranos
Operalia, The World Opera Competition prize-winners
University of Music and Performing Arts Vienna alumni
21st-century Russian women opera singers
Volga Tatar people
Musicians from Kazan
Russian National Music Award winners
Opera crossover singers
Fifa World Cup ceremonies performers